Theodore I. Post (March 31, 1918 – August 20, 2013) was an American director of film and television. Highly prolific, Post directed numerous episodes of well-known television series including Rawhide, Gunsmoke, and The Twilight Zone as well as blockbuster films such as Hang 'Em High, Beneath the Planet of the Apes and Magnum Force.

Biography

Early life and career
Born in Brooklyn, NY, Post started his career in 1938 working as an usher at Loew's Pitkin Theater. He abandoned plans to become an actor after training with Tamara Daykarhanova, and turned to directing summer theatre, where Post began his lengthy association in the director's chair. Upon returning home from his service with the United States Army Special Services in Italy during World War II, he resumed his experience in theater and when the new medium of television was born, his career took off.  

Post taught acting and drama at New York's High School of Performing Arts in 1950. He persuaded his friend Sidney Lumet to do likewise.

Television series
Success in the theater led to directorial work in television from the early 1950s, beginning with The Ford Television Theatre. Post directed episodes of many series, including Gunsmoke, Perry Mason, Wagon Train, Rawhide, The Twilight Zone, Combat!, Columbo and 178 episodes of Peyton Place. He also directed TV films (including the original Cagney & Lacey film-of-the-week).

Films
He also directed feature films, including the second installment of the Planet of the Apes film series, Beneath the Planet of the Apes (1970), Go Tell the Spartans (1978), Good Guys Wear Black (1978), starring Chuck Norris, and two Clint Eastwood films, Hang 'Em High, the movie which launched Clint Eastwood's career as a leading man in American pictures. and Magnum Force.

Post directed the 2001–02 Festival of the Arts at the University of Judaism (now the American Jewish University).

Personal/Family life
Post married the former Thelma Fiefel in 1940. They had two children, one of whom is the law scholar and professor Robert Post.

Death
Post died at the UCLA Medical Center, Santa Monica, California on August 20, 2013.

Selected filmography

Film

 The Peacemaker (1956)
 The Legend of Tom Dooley (1959)
 Hang 'Em High (1968)
 Beneath the Planet of the Apes (1970)
 Magnum Force (1973)
 The Harrad Experiment (1973)
 The Baby (1973)
 Whiffs (1975)
 Good Guys Wear Black (1978)
 Go Tell the Spartans (1978)
 Nightkill (1980)
 The Human Shield (1991)
 4 Faces (1999)

TV movies

 The Great Merlini (1951, pilot)
 Espionage: Far East (1961)
 Night Slaves (1970)
 Dr. Cook's Garden (1971)
 Do Not Fold, Spindle or Mutilate (1971)
 Yuma (1971)
 Five Desperate Women (1971)
 The Bravos (1972)
 Sandcastles (1972)
 The Girls in the Office (1979)
 Diary of a Teenage Hitchhiker (1979)
 Cagney & Lacey (1981)
 Stagecoach (1986)

Television

 Armstrong Circle Theatre (1952)
 The Ford Television Theatre (1953)
 Schlitz Playhouse of Stars (1953)
 Gunsmoke (1955)
 Medic (1955)
 Zane Grey Theatre (1956)
 Screen Directors Playhouse (1956)
 The 20th Century Fox Hour (1956)
 Perry Mason (1957)
 Richard Diamond, Private Detective (1957)
 West Point (1957)
 Westinghouse Desilu Playhouse (1958)
 The Rifleman (1958)
 Law of the Plainsman (1959)
 The Westerner (1960)
 Checkmate (1960)
 Startime (1960) (The Young Juggler)
 Wagon Train (1960)
 Insight (1960)
 Alcoa Premiere (1961)
 The Defenders (1961)
 Route 66 (1961)
 The Virginian (1962)
 Combat! (1962)
 Empire (1962)
 Thriller (1961–1962)
 General Electric Theater (1962)
 Bus Stop (1962)
 Rawhide (1960–1962)
 Peyton Place (1964)
 The Twilight Zone (1960–1964)
 Bracken's World (1969)
 Monty Nash (1971)
 Baretta (1975)
 Ark II (1976)
 Columbo (1976)
 Future Cop (1977)
 Beyond Westworld (1980)
 B.A.D. Cats (1980)

Short films
 The Return of Phileas Fogg (1957)

References

External links
 
 

1918 births
2013 deaths
20th-century American Jews
American Jewish University
American television directors
People from Brooklyn
Western (genre) film directors
Burials at Mount Sinai Memorial Park Cemetery
Film directors from New York City
21st-century American Jews